William Booth (9 May 1886 – 1963) was an English professional football centre half who played in the Football League for Sheffield United. He made 369 appearances for Brighton & Hove Albion and was a member of the team that won the 1909–10 Southern League First Division title and the 1910 FA Charity Shield. Booth was a non-playing reserve for England in February 1913.

Personal life 
Booth served as a private in the Football Battalion of the Middlesex Regiment during the First World War. He died in Brighton in 1963 at the age of 76.

Honours 
Brighton & Hove Albion

Southern League First Division: 1909–10
 FA Charity Shield: 1910

References

1886 births
1963 deaths
Footballers from Sheffield
English footballers
Association football wing halves
Sheffield United F.C. players
Brighton & Hove Albion F.C. players
Castleford Town F.C. players
Worthing F.C. players
English Football League players
Southern Football League players
Midland Football League players
Southern Football League representative players
British Army personnel of World War I
Middlesex Regiment soldiers